The 1966 United States Senate election in Idaho took place on November 8, 1966. Incumbent Republican Senator Leonard B. Jordan was re-elected to a second term in office over Democratic U.S. Representative Ralph R. Harding.

General election

Results

See also 
 1966 United States Senate elections

References 

1966
Idaho
United States Senate